"Dónde está el Amor" is a song recorded by Spanish singer-songwriter Pablo Alborán. The song is included on his second studio album, Tanto (2012).

It was re-recorded featuring Mexican pop duo Jesse & Joy and released as the first single from the re-release of Tanto (2013) in September 2013. It was the second single release by Alborán and Jesse and Joy in 2013, following "La de la Mala Suerte" in June.

In 2014 at the 15th Annual Latin Grammy Awards the song was nominated for Record of the Year.

Chart performance

2016 re-release

Alborán recorded a new version of the song featuring Brazilian singer-songwriter Tiê. It was released in August 2016 and taken from the soundtrack to the telenovela Haja Coração.

Chart performance

Certifications

References 

2012 songs
2013 singles
2016 singles
Pablo Alborán songs
Jesse & Joy songs
Songs written by Pablo Alborán